Das Leben geht weiter (also known as Life Goes On) is a 2002 German documentary film directed by Mark Cairns.

Synopsis 
Autumn 1944 – The Third Reich is near to collapse and the first Allied soldiers are on German soil. Meanwhile, just outside Berlin, the cameras start rolling on one of the biggest propaganda films ever planned by the Nazis:  – a film intended to show how the German people cope and retain their spirit through the destruction and horror of their everyday life, struggling through to the promised victory. The premiere for this film was planned for the end of June 1945, two months after the war was lost. This is the absurd and often tragic story behind the making of Das Leben geht weiter.

Cast 
Dieter Moor ... Narrador
Hans Abich ... Himself
Günther Anders ... Himself (voice) (archive footage)
Frank Brückner ... Soldado
Joseph Goebbels ... Himself (as Josef Goebbels)
Heinz Graue ... Himself
Veit Harlan ... Himself (archive footage)
Elisabeth Lennartz ... Himself (as Elisabeth Knuth-Lennartz)
Wolfgang Liebeneiner ... Himself (archive footage)
Gunnar Möller ... Himself
Heinz Pehlke ... Himself
Karl Ritter ... Himself (archive footage)
Siegfried Wolter ... Himself

Awards

See also 
 Nazi Germany

References

External links 
 }

2002 films
German documentary films
2002 documentary films
Documentary films about World War II
2000s German films
Films about filmmaking